Kasparov Chess is a commercial internet chess server, internet forum and social networking website.  The former World Chess Champion Garry Kasparov is affiliated with this online chess club.

Early history
KasparovChess.com domain was first used to launch Garry Kasparov's chess website in early 2000. To commemorate its opening, Kasparov played a simul with around 30 junior players from around the world, many of them online on his own chess server in 2000. Later, KasparovChess.com hosted a tournament of junior players. Sometime after, the site became inactive, until this domain was used again in 2021.

Financing
Kasparov Chess is financed by private investors and Vivendi, through its subsidiary Keysquare, a media conglomerate headquartered in Paris, France. In October 2019, Keysquare was allocated a capital investment of €3.5 million Euros from Vivendi to start the project.

Kasparov Chess has a freemium business model with a free option for some chess content coupled with a premium option charge of $13.99 monthly or $119.99 for a yearly subscription for all the available chess content.

Chess content
Kasparov Chess offers chess puzzles, online chess, tutorials, articles, documentaries, podcasts and a chess masterclass taught by Kasparov; however, some of these features are only available to members with a paid subscription.  At the launch of the company in April 2021, there will be available 50,000 exercises, 700 lessons and 400 hours of videos.

Multimedia

Kasparov Chess is utilizing dedicated servers to host Discord software.    Discord is group-chatting application software that provides members with a place to build communities and online chat with text-chat, voice-chat, video-chat and to share digital content including: videos, images, internet links, music and more.

Competition
In order to establish itself as a mainstream chess platform and a profit-making venture, Kasparov Chess will have to compete against many well-established Internet chess servers.  These include entirely free online chess servers, such as Lichess and Free Internet Chess Server, and the several commercial chess communities including Chess.com, Chess24, FIDE Online Arena, Internet Chess Club and Playchess offering similar freemium subscriptions for chess content as Kasparov Chess.

In 1999, Garry Kasparov and Israeli investors attempted to establish a commercial online chess club called Kasparov Chess Online that never reached a profitable status and became defunct in 2002.

See also 
 List of Internet chess servers

External links
 Kasparov Chess - Homepage

References

2021 establishments in France
2021 in chess
French social networking websites
Android (operating system) software
Chess databases
Chess in France
Garry Kasparov
Internet chess servers
Internet properties established in 2021
iOS games
Multilingual websites
Online video game services